Kobe Green Arena is an indoor sporting arena located in Kobe, Japan.  The capacity of the arena is 6,000 people.

The arena hosted games of several global women's volleyball tournaments, including the official 2006 Women's Volleyball World Championship and also for the FIVB World Grand Prix 2008. Amongst others, the USA, Kazakhstan, Turkey and Japan played there.

See also
Kobe Sports Park Baseball Stadium
Kobe Universiade Memorial Stadium

External links
http://www.kobe-park.or.jp/sougou/facilities/arena/

Basketball venues in Japan
Indoor arenas in Japan
Sports venues in Hyōgo Prefecture
Sport in Kobe
Buildings and structures in Kobe
Tourist attractions in Kobe